Jaap ter Haar (25 March 1922 – 26 February 1998) was a prolific Dutch author of children's literature.

Career 

Early in his career ter Haar worked for the Radio Netherlands Worldwide. In addition to his day job, ter Haar made many radio plays for broadcaster NCRV featuring stories of the characters Saskia and Jeroen. These stories were later adapted and published as a book series. When Radio Netherlands Worldwide no longer permitted employees to earn income outside of work, ter Haar decided to become a full-time writer in 1952. Out of financial necessity, he published many books over the course of his career. In addition to the characters Saskia and Jeroen, he also wrote many book series featuring the characters Lotje, Eelke, and Ernstjan and Schnabbeltje.

Ter Haar won the Nienke van Hichtum-prijs in 1972 for his book Geschiedenis van de Lage Landen. He won the Gouden Griffel award for his book Het wereldje van Beer Ligthart. In 1976 he won the Buxtehude Bull for the book Behalt das Leben lieb, the German translation of Het wereldje van Beer Ligthart by Hans-Joachim Schädlich.

Ter Haar's books have been illustrated by various illustrators, including Gerard van Straaten, Charlotte Dematons and Rein van Looy. Other illustrators include Rien Poortvliet and Otto Dicke.

Death 

Ter Haar died in February 1998.

Awards 

 1972: Nienke van Hichtum-prijs, Geschiedenis van de Lage Landen
 1974: Gouden Griffel, Het wereldje van Beer Ligthart
 1976: Buxtehude Bull, Behalt das Leben lieb

References

External links 

 Jaap ter Haar (in Dutch), Digital Library for Dutch Literature
 Jaap ter Haar (in Dutch), jeugdliteratuur.org

1922 births
1998 deaths
Dutch children's writers
Nienke van Hichtum Prize winners
Gouden Griffel winners